William Ray Kennedy (born October 26, 1952) is a Canadian former swimmer who competed at the 1972 Summer Olympics.  He swam for Canada's third-place team in the preliminary heats of the men's 4x100-metre medley relay.  He was ineligible to receive a medal under the Olympic swimming rules then in effect, however, because he did not swim in the event final.  He also competed in the preliminary heats of the men's 200-metre backstroke, but did not advance.

Kennedy won a bronze medal in the 100-metre backstroke at the 1971 Pan American Games in Cali, Colombia, and gold medals in the 100-metre backstroke and 4x100-metre medley relay at the 1970 Commonwealth Games in Edinburgh, Scotland.

See also
 List of Commonwealth Games medallists in swimming (men)
 List of University of Michigan alumni

References

External links

1952 births
Living people
Canadian male breaststroke swimmers
Canadian male medley swimmers
Michigan Wolverines men's swimmers
Olympic swimmers of Canada
Swimmers from London, Ontario
Swimmers at the 1971 Pan American Games
Swimmers at the 1972 Summer Olympics
Swimmers at the 1970 British Commonwealth Games
Commonwealth Games gold medallists for Canada
Pan American Games bronze medalists for Canada
Commonwealth Games medallists in swimming
Pan American Games medalists in swimming
Medalists at the 1971 Pan American Games
Medalists at the 1972 Summer Olympics
Olympic bronze medalists in swimming
Olympic bronze medalists for Canada
20th-century Canadian people
21st-century Canadian people
Medallists at the 1970 British Commonwealth Games